Bruck-Waasen was a municipality in the district of Grieskirchen in the Austrian state of Upper Austria.

Geography
Bruck-Waasen was lying in the Hausruckviertel. About 10 percent of the municipality is forest, and 80 percent is farmland.

References

Cities and towns in Grieskirchen District